The sixth season of Shameless, an American comedy-drama television series based on the British series of the same name by Paul Abbott, premiered on January 10, 2016, concluded April 3, 2016. Executive producers are John Wells, Andrew Stearn, Nancy M. Pimental, Davey Holmes, Christopher Chulack, Krista Vernoff and producers Terri Murphy and Princess Nash.

Plot
Fiona struggles with work at Patsy's Pies after being promoted to assistant manager. Though she is still married to Gus, Fiona has begun a sexual relationship with Sean. When Fiona unexpectedly finds out she is pregnant (and does not know who the father is), she ultimately decides to get an abortion.

Carl gets an early release from juvie and begins acting on a tough persona, selling weapons in school and continuing to work in the drug business. In the process, Carl begins dating a classmate, Dominique, whom he loses his virginity to. When Carl witnesses his friend, Nick, killing a neighborhood boy over a stolen bike, Carl decides he no longer wants to pursue a criminal lifestyle and confides in Fiona. Meanwhile, Debbie has decided to keep her baby, but Derek, not ready to become a father, abandons her. When Fiona refuses to support Debbie through her pregnancy, Debbie gets assistance from Frank, who has been mourning the loss of Bianca. When Sammi's mother, Queenie, comes into town following Chuckie's release from juvie, Debbie and Frank briefly travel with Queenie to her family's rural commune, where they grow opium poppies.

Lip continues his relationship with his professor, Helene, but Amanda exacts revenge by exposing a naked picture of Helene in Lip's dorm that goes viral. Lip simultaneously loses his dorm and job, and Helene promises to break off all contact with Lip at a disciplinary hearing. With Lip's drinking habits worsening, he befriends Professor Youens, who acts as Lip's mentor. Lip's descent into alcoholism gets him expelled from college for assaulting a campus guard; Youens convinces Lip to attend Alcoholics Anonymous meetings. Ian puts his relationship with Mickey behind him and begins dating a firefighter, Caleb. With Caleb's encouragement, Ian begins working towards become a firefighter and he lands an EMT job at the end of the season. With Mickey in prison, Svetlana, who has begun working at the Alibi, faces deportation. In order to stay in the United States, Svetlana divorces Mickey and marries Veronica. In the process, Kevin, Veronica, and Svetlana begin a polyamorous relationship.

Fiona faces even more problems when the Gallaghers are given an eviction notice on their house. The house is bid for auction, but the family loses the bid and are forced to move out. Fiona briefly moves in with Sean and attempts to connect with his young son, Will. When the people who initially bought the house rescind the bid, Fiona attempts to get Gus to sign a sheet that recognizes his lack of property claim. But Gus refuses, resentful of Fiona for her past infidelity, and requests for an amicable divorce. At the divorce suit, Sean shows up in front of Gus and his lawyers and proposes to Fiona, who happily accepts. With Carl's help, the Gallaghers are able to reclaim their house, and Sean moves in with Fiona.

As Fiona begins preparing for her wedding, Debbie and Frank return from Queenie's rural commune just in time for Debbie to give birth to a baby girl. To the family's surprise, Debbie names her daughter Frances "Franny" Gallagher, after her father. Days before the wedding, Sean clashes with Frank over his behavior towards his own kids, and he challenges Frank's authority as head of the household. After the two men get into an argument, Frank vows for revenge against Sean; he sneaks into Sean's office and discovers that Sean is still shooting heroin, something that is unknown to Fiona.

During Fiona's wedding ceremony, Frank shows up—uninvited—and reveals to the entire congregation about Sean's heroin, devastating Fiona. Will angrily leaves the ceremony. Sean confronts a heartbroken Fiona, admitting that he had been using for months, and tells Fiona to "take care of herself." While Sean leaves to fight for custody of Will, the rest of the family—including Caleb, Svetlana, Kevin, and Veronica—kidnap Frank and angrily throw him into the freezing river. They flee the area, hoping for Frank's death, to guarantee he is out of their lives forever.

Cast and characters

Main
 William H. Macy as Frank Gallagher
 Emmy Rossum as Fiona Gallagher Pfender
 Jeremy Allen White as Philip "Lip" Gallagher
 Ethan Cutkosky as Carl Gallagher
 Shanola Hampton as Veronica "V" Fisher
 Steve Howey as Kevin "Kev" Ball
 Emma Kenney as Debbie Gallagher
 Cameron Monaghan as Ian Gallagher

Special guest stars
 Noel Fisher as Mickey Milkovich
 Dermot Mulroney as Sean Pierce
 Sasha Alexander as Helene Runyon Robinson
Emma Greenwell as Mandy Milkovich
 Steve Kazee as Gus Pfender
 Sherilyn Fenn as Queenie Slott

Recurring
 Isidora Goreshter as Svetlana Milkovich
 Alan Rosenberg as Professor Youens
 Jeff Pierre as Caleb
 Brendan and Brandon Sims as Liam Gallagher 
 Kellen Michael as Chuckie Slott
 Ever Carradine as Erika Wexler
 Will Sasso as Yanis
 Nichole Bloom as Amanda
 Michael McMillian as Tyler Wexler
 Victor I. Onuigbo as Nick
 Jaylen Barron as Dominique Winslow
 Peter Macon as Sergeant Winslow
 Michael Reilly Burke as Theo Robinson
 Jim Hoffmaster as Kermit
 Michael Patrick McGill as Tommy
 Vanessa Bell Calloway as Carol
 Chris Brochu as Dylan Robinson
 Reed Emmons as Will Pierce
 Jenica Bergere as Lisa
 Lee Stark as Lisa
 Andrew Asper as Jason
 Rebecca Metz as Melinda
 José Julián as Joaquin
 Tyler Jacob Moore as Tony
 Brent Sexton as Patrick Gallagher
 Gabrielle Walsh as Tanya
 Luca Oriel as Derek Delgado

Episodes

Development and production
Shameless was renewed for a sixth season on January 12, 2015; which premiered on January 10, 2016. The writers began working on the season on April 6, 2015. Principal photography for the season began on August 5, 2015.

Reception
Review aggregator Rotten Tomatoes gives the sixth season 100%, based on 10 reviews. The critics consensus reads, "Shameless' sixth season charts a tragic trajectory for the Gallaghers, leaving viewers in suspense as they hope against hope that this family from the wrong side of the tracks can find long-lasting stability."

References

External links
 
 

Shameless (American TV series)
2016 American television seasons
Teenage pregnancy in television